Tord Holmgren (born 9 November 1957) is a Swedish former footballer who played as a midfielder.

Holmgren won the UEFA Cup twice, in 1982 and 1987. He spent most of his career playing alongside his younger brother Tommy Holmgren for IFK Göteborg.

External links
 
 

1957 births
Living people
Swedish footballers
Association football midfielders
Allsvenskan players
IFK Göteborg players
Fredrikstad FK players
Sweden international footballers
UEFA Cup winning players